OSIA may refer to:
Open Source Industry Australia
Order of the Sons of Italy
On-Site Inspection Agency
Open Standard Identity APIs